Spatial music is composed music that intentionally exploits sound localization. Though present in Western music from biblical times in the form of the antiphon, as a component specific to new musical techniques the concept of spatial music (Raummusik, usually translated as "space music") was introduced as early as 1928 in Germany.

The term spatialisation is connected especially with electroacoustic music to denote the projection and localization of sound sources in physical or virtual space or sound's spatial movement in space.

Context
The term "spatial music" indicates music in which the location and movement of sound sources is a primary compositional parameter and a central feature for the listener. It may involve a single, mobile sound source, or multiple, simultaneous, stationary or mobile sound events in different locations.

There are at least three distinct categories when plural events are treated spatially:
essentially independent events separated in space, like simultaneous concerts, each with a strong signaling character
one or several such signaling events, separated from more "passive" reverberating background complexes
separated but coordinated performing groups.

Examples
Examples of spatiality include more than seventy works by Giovanni Pierluigi da Palestrina (canticles, litanies, masses, Marian antiphons, psalm- and sequence-motets), the five-choir, forty- and sixty-voice Missa sopra Ecco sì beato giorno by Alessandro Striggio and the possibly related eight-choir, forty-voice motet Spem in alium by Thomas Tallis, as well as a number of other Italian—mainly Florentine—works dating between 1557 and 1601.

Notable 20th-century spatial compositions include Charles Ives's Fourth Symphony (1912–18), Rued Langgaard's Music of the Spheres (1916–18), Edgard Varèse's Poème électronique (Expo '58), Henryk Górecki's Scontri, op. 17 (1960), which unleashes a volume of sound with a "tremendous orchestra" for which the composer precisely dictates the placement of each player onstage, including fifty-two percussion instruments, Karlheinz Stockhausen's Helicopter String Quartet (1992–93/95), which is "arguably the most extreme experiment involving the spatial motility of live performers", and Henry Brant's Ice Field, a "'spatial narrative,'" or "spatial organ concerto," awarded the 2002 Pulitzer Prize for Music, as well as most of the output after 1960 of Luigi Nono, whose late works—e.g., ... sofferte onde serene ... (1976), Al gran sole carico d'amore (1972–77), Prometeo (1984), and A Pierre: Dell'azzurro silenzio, inquietuum (1985)—explicitly reflect the spatial soundscape of his native Venice, and cannot be performed without their spatial component.

Technological developments have led to broader distribution of spatial music via smartphones since at least 2011, to include sounds experienced via Global Positioning System localization (BLUEBRAIN, Matmos, others) and visual inertial odometry through augmented reality (TCW, others).

See also

 5.1 surround sound
 3D audio effect
 Ambisonics
 Auditory spatial attention
 Audium (theater)
 Directional sound
 Dolby Atmos
 Holophones
 Octophonic sound
 Planephones
 Quadraphonic sound
 Stereophonic sound
 Surround sound
 Ton de Leeuw
 Venetian polychoral style
 Venetian School (music)
 Wave field synthesis

Sources

Further reading

 Arnold, Denis, Anthony F. Carver, and Valerio Morucci. 2014. "Cori spezzati/polychoral (It.: 'broken choirs')". Grove Music Online (1 July). Oxford Music Online.
 Atticks, Barry. 2005. "Utilizing 3-D Computer Animation to Increase Cognitive Understanding of Contemporary Electronic Spacemusic". In Systems Research in the Arts VII: Music, Environmental Design, and the Choreography of Space, edited by George E. Lasker, James Rhodes, and Jane Lily, 141–145. Tecumseh, Ontario, Canada: International Institute for Advanced Studies in Systems Research and Cybernetics. .
 Brant, Henry. 1955. "The Uses of Antiphonal Distribution and Polyphony of Tempi in Composing". American Composer's Alliance Bulletin 4, no. 3: 13–15.
 Brant, Henry. 1978. "Space as an Essential Aspect of Musical Composition". In Contemporary Composers on Contemporary Music, edited by Elliott Schwartz and Barney Childs, with Jim Fox, 221–242. Da Capo Press Music Reprint Series. New York: Da Capo Press.
 
 Copps, Will. "Spatial Music the Latest Innovation to Provide New Experiences and Give Musicians Back Control." Sound and Design, Medium. (January 10, 2020)
 Drennan, Dorothy Carter. 1975. "Henry Brant's Use of Ensemble Dispersion, as Found in the Analysis of Selected Compositions". Ph.D. diss. Coral Gables: University of Miami.
 Erickson, Robert. 1975. Sound Structure in Music. Berkeley, Los Angeles, and London: The University of California Press.
 Fiotti, Francesco. 2003. "Il Poéme electronique: Un'opera d'arte totale e il suo contenitore". Musica/realtà: Rivista quadrimestrale 24, no. 70 (March): 123–133.
 Gutknecht, Dieter. 2003. "Karlheinz Stockhausens Hymnen und der Aspekt der Raummusik". In Bühne, Film, Raum und Zeit in der Musik des 20. Jahrhunderts, edited by Hartmut Krones, 275–284. Wiener Schriften zur Stilkunde und Aufführungspraxis 3. Vienna: Böhlau. .
 Harley, Maria Anna. 1994a. "Space and Spatialization in Contemporary Music: History and Analysis, Ideas and Implementations". Ph.D. diss. Montreal: McGill University.
 Harley, Maria. 1994b. "Spatial Sound Movement in the Instrumental Music of Iannis Xenakis". Journal of New Music Research 23:291–314.
 Harley, Maria Anna. 1997. "An American in Space: Henry Brant's 'Spatial Music'". American Music 15, no. 1 (Spring): 70–92.
 Harley, Maria Anna. 1998. "Music of Sound and Light: Xenakis's Polytopes". Leonardo: Journal of the International Society for the Arts, Sciences and Technology 31, no. 1 (February): 55–65.
 Hofmann, Boris. 2008. Mitten im Klang: Die Raumkompositionen von Iannis Xenakis aus den 1960er Jahren. Hofheim: Wolke-Verlag.
 Ives, Charles. 1933. "Music and Its Future". In American Composers on American Music: A Symposium, edited by Henry Cowell. Reprinted, New York: Frederick Ungar Publishing, by arrangement with Stanford University Press, 1962.
 Lombardo, Vincenzo, Andrea Valle, John Fitch, Kees Tazelaar, Stefan Weinzierl, and Wojciech Borczyk. 2009. "A Virtual-Reality Reconstruction of Poème électronique Based on Philological Research". Computer Music Journal 33, no. 2 (Summer): 24–47.
 Loy, Gareth. 1985. "About Audium – A Conversation with Stanley Shaff.” Computer Music Journal 9, no. 2 (Summer): 41–48.
 Luening, Otto. 1968. "An Unfinished History of Electronic Music". Music Educators Journal 55, no. 3 (November): 42–49, 135–142, 145.
 Lukes, Roberta Dorothy. 1996. "The Poème electronique of Edgard Varèse". Ph.D. diss. Cambridge: Harvard University.
 Miller, Paul. 2009. "Stockhausen and the Serial Shaping of Space". Ph.D. diss. Rochester: University of Rochester, Eastman School of Music.
 Müller-Hornbach, Gerhard. 2003. "Phänomene räumlicher Wahrnehmung als Bedingung musikalischer Kompositionen". In Musik und Architektur, edited by Christoph Metzger, 75–81. Saarbrücken: Pfau-Verlag. .
 Nauck, Gisela. 1997. Musik im Raum—Raum in der Musik: Ein Beitrag zur Geschichte der seriellen Musik. Supplement to the Archiv für Musikwissenschaft 38. Stuttgart: Franz Steiner Verlag.
 Nettingsmeier, Jörn. "Ardour and Ambisonics: A FLOSS approach to the next generation of sound spatialisation." eContact! 11.3 — Logiciels audio « open source » / Open Source for Audio Application (September 2009). Montréal: CEC.
 Ouzounian, Gascia. 2007. "Visualizing Acoustic Space". Circuit: Musiques contemporaines 17, no. 3: 45–56.
 Overholt, Sara Ann. 2006. "Karlheinz Stockhausen's Spatial Theories: Analyses of Gruppen fuer drei Orchester and Oktophonie, Electronische  Musik vom Dienstag aus Licht". Ph.D. diss. Santa Barbara: University of California, Santa Barbara.
 Platz, Robert H. P. 2003. "Musikraumarchitektur: Raummusik". In Musik und Architektur, edited by Christoph Metzger, 51–58 Saarbrücken: Pfau-Verlag. .
 Rastall, Richard. 1997. "Spatial Effects in English Instrumental Consort Music, c. 1560–1605". Early Music 25, no. 2:269–288.
 Reynolds, Roger. 1978. "Thoughts on Sound Movement and Meaning". Perspectives of New Music 16, no. 1 (Spring-Summer): 181–190.
 Roschitz, Karlheinz. 1969. "Beiträge 1968/69". Beiträge der Österreichische Gesellschaft für Musik 2.
 Schnebel, Dieter. 2000. "Zur Uraufführung von Extasis für Solosopran, Schlagzeugslo, vierfach geteilten Chor und großes Orchester". In 'Komposition und Musikwissenschaft im Dialog I (1997–1998), edited by Imke Misch and Christoph von Blumröder, 26–39. Signale aus Köln: Musik der Zeit 3. Saarbrücken: Pfau-Verlag. .
 Solōmos, Makīs. 1998. "Notes sur la spatialisation de la musique et l'émergence du son". In Le son et l'espace, edited by Hugues Genevois, 105–125. Musique et Sciences. Lyon: Aléas. .
 Stockhausen, Karlheinz. 1957. "Musik im Raum". Die Reihe 5 ("Berichte—Analyse"): 59–73. Reprinted in his Texte zur Musik 1, edited by Dieter Schnebel, 152–175. Excerpt reprinted under the same title in Darmstädter Beiträge zur Neuen Musik 2, 30–35. Mainz: Schott, 1959. English version, as "Music in Space", translated by Ruth Koenig. Die Reihe 5 ("Reports—Analyses", 1961): 67–82.
 Stockhausen, Karlheinz. 2000. "Neue Raum-Musik: Oktophonie", transcribed by Michael Öhler. In Komposition und Musikwissenschaft im Dialog I (1997–1998), edited by Imke Misch and Christoph von Blumröder, 60–77. Signale aus Köln: Musik der Zeit 3. Saarbrücken: Pfau-Verlag. .
 Stockhausen, Karlheinz. 2009. Kompositorische Grundlage Neuer Musik: sechs Seminare für die Darmstädter Ferienkurse 1970, edited by Imke Misch. Kürten: Stockhausen-Stiftung für Musik. .
 Sykes, Debra. 1996. "Henry Brant and His Music: Spatialman". Musicworks: Explorations in Sound, no. 64 (Spring): 42–48.
 Teruggi, Daniel. 2007. "Technology and Musique Concrete: The Technical Developments of the Groupe de Recherches Musicales and Their Implication in Musical Composition". Organised Sound 12, no. 3:213–231.
 Thigpen, Ben. "Spatialization Without Panning." eContact! 11.4 — Toronto Electroacoustic Symposium 2009 (TES) / Symposium Électroacoustique 2009 de Toronto (December 2009). Montréal: CEC.
 Trochimczyk, Maja. 2001. "From Circles to Nets: On the Signification of Spatial Sound Imagery in New Music". Computer Music Journal 25, no. 4 (Winter): 39–56.
 Winckel, Fritz. 1968. "Elektroakustische Musik—Raummusik—Kybernetische Musik". Beiträge der Österreichischen Gesellschaft für Musik 1:72–79.
 . 1961. "Current Chronicle: Germany". The Musical Quarterly 47, no. 2 (April): 243–247.
 Zelli, Bijan. "Space and Computer Music: A Survey of Methods, Systems and Musical Implications." eContact! 11.4 — Toronto Electroacoustic Symposium 2009 (TES) / Symposium Électroacoustique 2009 de Toronto (December 2009). Montréal: CEC.
 Zvonar, Richard. "An Extremely Brief History of Spatial Music in the 20th Century." eContact! 7.4 — Diffusion multi-canal / Multichannel diffusion (May 2005). Montréal: CEC.

External links
 García Karman, Gregorio. 5 October 2007. "Studio Report: Spatialization of Karlheinz Stockhausen's Cosmic Pulses". (accessed 4 April 2014).

Electronic music
Vocal music